An AR-15 style pistol is a handgun assembled using an AR-15 style receiver with suitable parts to create a pistol held and fired with one hand.

History 
Colt's Manufacturing Company began marketing the Colt AR-15 self-loading rifle in 1964. These rifles were assembled from interchangeable parts designed to allow replacement of malfunctioning parts without the gunsmith skills and tools required for most firearms. Other manufacturers produced similar parts with features not found on production rifles. Some of these parts can be assembled to create firearms with overall length or barrel-length shorter than rifle dimensions specified by law. These small firearms may be defined as pistols by local laws.

Advantages

 Pistols allow use of firearms by disabled persons without full use of both hands.
 Pistols may be stored in spaces too small to hold a rifle.
 Pistols may be carried more easily than rifles.
 Pistols are easier to use in confined spaces.

Disadvantages 
 The AR-15 style receiver is larger and heavier than most handgun actions.
 Many AR-15 cartridges produce lower velocity with distracting muzzle flash and muzzle blast when fired from pistol barrels.
 Pistol dimensions reduce accuracy available from more stable holding positions with larger firearms.

Publicity 
AR-15 style pistols have been publicized by Hollywood films including Clear and Present Danger, Bad Boys, and Spawn.

References 

Semi-automatic pistols
Modular firearms